Kenneth Carlton Edelin (March 31, 1939 – December 30, 2013) was an American physician known for his support for abortion rights and his advocacy for indigent patients' rights to healthcare. He was born in Washington, D.C. and died in Sarasota, Florida.

Edelin was convicted of manslaughter in 1975 after performing an abortion in Boston City Hospital at the wish of the pregnant woman. He was prosecuted by Newman A. Flanagan. In 2008, Edelin received the "Maggie" Award, highest honor of the Planned Parenthood Federation, in tribute to their founder, Margaret Sanger.

Biography

Edelin is the youngest of four children born to Benedict Edelin, a postal worker and the former Ruby Goodwin. He attended segregated schools is the Washington, DC area until he transferred to the Stockbridge School in western Massachusetts, where he graduated in 1957.

After earning a bachelor's degree at Columbia College in 1961, Edelin taught math and science at Stockbridge for two years. He would go on to study at Meharry Medical College, where he earned his medical degree in 1967.

In 1975, while a resident at Boston City Hospital, Edelin became embroiled in a controversy when he performed an elective abortion on an unmarried 17-year-old girl who was six months pregnant. Edelin, who is African American, was tried and convicted of performing the abortion by an all-white jury which included ten Roman Catholics. He was sentenced to one year of probation, but could have potentially faced twenty years in prison. Edelin appealed the verdict to the Massachusetts Supreme Judicial Court the following year. In a unanimous ruling, the conviction was overturned and Edelin was formally acquitted by the Court. The ruling was significant for two reasons. First, it helped to clarify the definition of "life" and it also shielded doctors from criminal prosecution for performing certain abortions.

Edelin served as chairman of the Planned Parenthood Federation of America from 1989 to 1992.

Notes

Further reading
 Kenneth C. Edelin, Broken Justice: A True Story of Race, Sex and Revenge in a Boston Courtroom (2007 memoir)
 William C. Nolen, The Baby in the Bottle (1978) - book about His case was the subject of a 1978 book, "The Baby in the Bottle," by William A. Nolen
 Commonwealth v. Kenneth Edelin, 371 Mass. 497 (Dec. 17, 1976)
 Homans, WP, "Commonwealth v. Kenneth Edelin : A First in Criminal Prosecution Since Roe v. Wade", Crim. Justice J., v.1, n.2, pp. 207–232 (Spring 1977).

1939 births
2013 deaths
American obstetricians
American gynecologists
African-American physicians
Meharry Medical College alumni
Boston University faculty
United States Air Force officers
People associated with Planned Parenthood
20th-century African-American people
21st-century African-American people

Columbia College (New York) alumni